Kállai is a surname. Notable people with the surname include:
 
Ákos Kállai (born 1974), Hungarian modern pentathlete
Gyula Kállai (1910–1996), Hungarian politician
Norbert Kállai (born 1984), Hungarian footballer

See also
 Kállay
 Kallai (disambiguation)